Saoussen Dlindah Boudiaf (born 31 December 1993) is a French sabre fencer. She won the gold medal in the women's individual sabre event at the 2022 Mediterranean Games held in Oran, Algeria.

References

1993 births
Living people
French female sabre fencers
Fencers at the 2016 Summer Olympics
Olympic fencers of France
Mediterranean Games gold medalists for Algeria
Competitors at the 2022 Mediterranean Games
Mediterranean Games medalists in fencing
21st-century French women